Elfriede Brüning (8 November 1910 – 5 August 2014) was a German communist journalist and novelist. She also used the pseudonym Elke Klent.

Life and career
Elfriede Brüning was born in Berlin, the daughter of a cabinetmaker and a seamstress who were involved in the workers' movement. Forced to leave school after the tenth year to help support the family, she worked in offices; beginning in 1929, she was a secretary at a Berlin film company. After forging a letter of recommendation, she began to publish articles in the Feuilleton sections of newspapers such as the Berliner Tageblatt, the Berliner Börsen-Courier and the Vossische Zeitung. After attending a Marxist Workers' School, she joined the Communist Party (KPD) in 1930 and thereafter wrote mainly for the Communist press. In 1932 she joined the Association of Proletarian-Revolutionary Authors; then the youngest in her branch, she was to be the last surviving member. Her first novel, Handwerk hat goldenen Boden, was a social criticism and was to be published in 1933 but was not because of the Nazi seizure of power; it appeared in 1970 under the title Kleine Leute. Brüning turned to lighter reading and in 1934 published Und außerdem ist Sommer, which was a success.

During the early years of the Nazi régime, Brüning participated in the Communist resistance, writing for the exile newspaper Neue Deutsche Blätter under the pseudonym Elke Klent and making trips to Prague, where it was published, as a courier for the Association of Proletarian-Revolutionary Authors. The KPD's illegal central committee met in the flat at her parents' shop. On 12 October 1935 she was arrested and imprisoned in the women's prison on Barnimstraße, but was released after her trial for treason in 1937, since the Gestapo was unable to prove she had engaged in illegal activities. She was able to obtain permission to write in prison, so in 1936 she published another novel, Junges Herz muß wandern.

In 1937 she married Joachim Barckhausen, a writer and editor; their daughter Christiane Barckhausen, born in 1942, also became a writer. Brüning worked as a script evaluator for a film company and with Barckhausen co-wrote the scenario for Semmelweis – Retter der Mütter, which was filmed by DEFA after the war. She spent the last years of the war on her in-laws' estate in the Magdeburg Börde.

Brüning returned to Berlin in 1946, reactivated her KPD membership, and wrote for and edited news periodicals in what later became the German Democratic Republic. Her marriage ended in 1948. From 1950 on, she was self-employed as a writer and lived in Berlin. After German reunification she became a member of The Left. She continued to give interviews into her old age.

She died in Berlin and was buried in the Dorotheenstadt cemetery. Her papers for the years 1930–2007 are in the Fritz Hüser Institute in Dortmund.

Selected honours
 1960: Patriotic Order of Merit in Bronze
 1975: Patriotic Order of Merit in Silver
 1980: Goethe Prize of the City of Berlin
 1980: Literature Prize of the Democratic Women's League of Germany
 1983: Art Prize of the Free German Trade Union Federation
 1985: Patriotic Order of Merit in Gold

Works
Brüning's publications include novels, short stories, journalism and television scripts. Her novels often have an autobiographical element; they usually concern women's lives and even the four she published under the Nazis have female protagonists who are determined to go against the party line by pursuing careers. They were popular in East Germany; by her 103rd birthday in 2013, a million and a half copies had been printed. But especially in the 1950s, she was officially attacked as "petty bourgeois" for her themes of women seeking equality in marriage, and her work was insufficiently optimistic for official tastes. Although often nominated, she did not receive the most prestigious East German prizes, the Literature Prize of the Democratic Women's League of Germany and Art Prize of the Free German Trade Union Federation, until the 1980s, when she was in her seventies. After reunification she continued to write about social injustices, including those of the reunification.

References

Further reading
 "Brüning, Elfriede". In: Inge Diersen, et al. Lexikon sozialistischer Schriftsteller deutscher Literatur. Leipzig: Bibliographisches Institut, 1964. . pp. 128–29 
 Eleonore Sent (Ed.) Elfriede Brüning. Ich mußte einfach schreiben, unbedingt. Briefwechsel mit Zeitgenossen 1930–2007. Essen: Klartext, 2008.   (letters)

External links

 Personal website
 Works by and about Elfriede Brüning, German National Library
 

1910 births
2014 deaths
German centenarians
Journalists from Berlin
Communist writers
German women novelists
Communist women writers
20th-century German novelists
20th-century German women writers
Women centenarians